This is a list of former monarchs of sovereign states who are living to date. While most monarchs retain their position for their lifetime, some choose to abdicate in favour of a younger heir, while other monarchs are deposed when their monarchies are abolished or when another ruler seizes power by force. By international courtesy, these individuals are usually still addressed by their monarchical titles.

Living former monarchs of sovereign states

Besides these, there are three living former holders of the title Yang di-Pertuan Agong (Sirajuddin of Perlis, Mizan Zainal Abidin of Terengganu and Muhammad V of Kelantan) in Malaysia (who are not listed because they remain leaders of one of the nine subnational Malay states), as well as two living former Presidents of France (Nicolas Sarkozy and François Hollande) who served as Co-Princes of Andorra. The most recent former monarch to die was King Constantine II of Greece, on 10 January 2023.

Other territorial ex-monarchs

Notes

See also
List of countries by date of transition to republican system of government

Former sovereign
Former sovereign monarchs